Hemming's Cartulary is a manuscript cartulary, or collection of charters and other land records, collected by a monk named Hemming around the time of the Norman Conquest of England. The manuscript comprises two separate cartularies that were made at different times and later bound together; it is in the British Library as MS Cotton Tiberius A xiii. The first was composed at the end of the 10th or beginning of the 11th century. The second section was compiled by Hemming and was written around the end of the 11th or the beginning of the 12th century. The first section, traditionally titled the Liber Wigorniensis, is a collection of Anglo-Saxon charters and other land records, most of which are organized geographically. The second section, Hemming's Cartulary proper, combines charters and other land records with a narrative of deprivation of property owned by the church of Worcester.

The two works are bound together in one surviving manuscript, the earliest surviving cartulary from medieval England. A major theme is the losses suffered by Worcester at the hands of royal officials and local landowners. Included amongst the despoilers are kings such as Cnut and William the Conqueror, and nobles such as Eadric Streona and Urse d'Abetot. Also included are accounts of lawsuits waged by the Worcester monks in an effort to regain their lost lands. The two sections of the cartulary were first printed in 1723. The original manuscript was slightly damaged by fire in 1733, and required rebinding.

Authorship and composition
Although the monk Hemming has traditionally been credited with all the works in the manuscript, the cartulary contains two works that were collected together, only one of which is by Hemming. The two works were bound together to form the manuscript (abbreviated MS) Cotton Tiberius A xiii, now held in the Cotton Library, a collection in the British Library. Together, the two works form the first surviving cartulary from medieval England. The first part is the so-called Liber Wigorniensis, or Book of Worcester, which takes up folios 1–118 of the manuscript. The second is Hemming's work, and takes up folios 119–142, 144–152 and 154–200. MS Cotton Nero E i and British Library MS Add 46204 may also contain charters collected as part of Hemming's work, as they have been identified by some scholars as having been produced during Hemming's lifetime, although others identify them as a copy of the Liber Wigorniensis.

Manuscript condition
The original manuscript containing the cartulary was damaged in a fire in 1733, but the damage was not serious. The edges of the manuscript were burned, which resulted in a few words being lost on the margins. Because of the fire damage, the manuscript was rebound in the 19th century, and each leaf was mounted separately. In addition to the two main sections, there are three smaller parchment pages bound in with the manuscript: folios 110, 143, and 153.

Liber Wigorniensis
The first part of the work is an early 11th-century collection of older charters, arranged geographically, with a section on late 10th-century land leases tacked on the end. The historian  gave this section of the work the title Liber Wigorniensis in 1961 to distinguish it from the later section actually assembled by Hemming. Dates for the compilation of the work include the suggestion by historian Neil Ker that it dates from between 1002 and 1016, when Wulfstan (the earlier Wulfstan – later a saint – who is not the Wulfstan who encouraged Hemming to compile the cartulary) held both the archbishopric of York and the bishopric of Worcester. Another historian, V. H. Galbraith, suggests that instead of being compiled in Wulfstan's episcopate, it was created during the episcopate of Ealdwulf, Wulfstan's predecessor in both sees. A third historian, David Dumville, argues that because no leases later than 996 are mentioned, it must date to a time-frame between 996 and 1016. There are 155 charters in the Liber, of which 10 are later insertions; the date of their incorporation ranges from the early to the late 11th century. Ker, who studied the original manuscript, has identified five main scribes involved in the manuscript in the first section. The scribal hands used are small and not very rounded, and resemble the type of writing prevalent in England during the early part of the 11th century. This section consists of 117 leaves in the original manuscript, each page with 26 lines of text. A few blank areas in the original manuscript copy have been filled with information in the later 11th and 12th centuries, mainly related to properties owned by the cathedral.

Hemming's cartulary proper
Hemming was the author of the second and later part, a collection of lands and rights belonging to the cathedral chapter of Worcester, as well as a narrative of the deeds of Wulfstan, the Bishop of Worcester who died in 1095, and Archbishop Ealdred of York. In this part of the work is a preface known as the Enucleatio libelli, where Hemming names himself as the person responsible for compiling the work, and names Wulfstan as the inspiration for his work. Another section, known as the Prefatio istius libelli, now much later in the manuscript but possibly meant as an introduction to the Codicellus, is a shorter introduction that gives the purpose of the collection. Historians usually take the two prefaces to mean that Wulfstan commissioned the work,Williams English and the Norman Conquest p. 145 but it is unclear whether it was created before or after Wulfstan's death. It may have been produced during the vacancy after Wulfstan's death, and before the appointment of the next bishop, Samson. Historian Nicholas Brooks, along with Vivian Galbraith, argues that Hemming's work was a response to the problems encountered by the diocese during the vacancy, when royal officials administered the lands of the bishopric. According to Brooks, the claim that Wulfstan ordered the composition of the cartulary was inaccurate, and was made to appeal to the authority of the bishop. The historian Julia Barrow believes that the inspiration for the work was the creation of the Domesday Book in 1086, although she agrees that the work was completed after Wulfstan's death. Hemming's work contains over 50 charters, some of which are duplicates of ones in the Liber.

The second section of the work is not just a collection of deeds and charters but includes other historical information of importance, especially for Hemming's monastery. The documents are connected by a narrative explaining why and how the cartulary was created; the narrative is usually given the title of Codicellus possessionum. This section of the work also includes the Life of the later Wulfstan, one of two contemporary records of Wulfstan's life. The organization is broadly geographical, with some information grouped by topic. In two sections, which are sometimes entitled "Indiculum Libertatis" and "Oswald's Indiculum", the work not only draws on charters but also incorporates regional information from a different type of source recording the holdings of tenants-in-chief. This has been identified as the documentation assembled at the shire-courts for the so-called Domesday survey, commissioned by William the Conqueror in 1085. More famously, the same records were later used for the compilation of Domesday Book. Some of the documents are in Latin, others are in Old English. Ker has identified the second part of the manuscript as being created by three scribes, describing their writing as "round and fairly large", in a style belonging to a period of transition between the late 11th and early 12th century. There are 80 leaves in the original manuscript. A few blank areas in the original manuscript were filled with information ranging from contemporary notes on landholdings of the cathedral to notes on the dissolution of Worcester Priory in the 16th century.

Themes and contents
Both the Liber Wigorniensis and Hemming's work contain a number of forged charters. The historian Julia Barrow has determined that at least 25 of the 155 charters in the Liber are forged, but cautions that this is the minimum estimate. Barrow identifies more than 30 of the charters in Hemming's work as forgeries, including some that are duplicates from the Liber. Some of the stories that form Hemming's narrative do not always agree with other sources, and Ker says "it is safer to trust to the main facts than to the details of his [Hemming's] stories".

Contents of the Liber Wigorniensis
The main goal of the Liber was to document the landholdings of the diocese and bishop, and to keep a register of the written charters and leases pertaining to the property of the church at Worcester. Because there is no narrative tying the documents together, the Liber should be seen as a working document, compiled for the use of the bishop and monks, and designed not as a literary work but a legal one. The Liber was revised during its working life, which adds further support for the working nature of the composition.

The charters constitute valuable evidence for prosopographical research and the study of land tenure in late Anglo-Saxon England. According to Donald A. Bullough, they also offer a window on the kind of social bonds which could be created by "neighbourhood". In the 10th century, the Bishop of Worcester leased out various small estates attached to the Church in the three counties (Worcestershire, Gloucestershire and Warwickshire) to several high-ranking men and women, usually for three lifespans. The pattern may be taken to suggest that this way of association served to "create a network, an inter-meshing, of high-status 'neighbours' ... with its central knot in Worcester and the domus of the bishop". In the bishop's residence or at home, the lessees may have come together to participate in convivial drinking, just as the Norman successors to these lands are envisaged as doing in William of Malmesbury's Life of St Wulfstan. Further, some of the thegns served in the royal army (fyrd) under the command of Bishop Oswald or his successors, which presupposes the creation of a personal warband and possibly one with the secondary purpose of protecting the bishop's properties.

Hemming's work

Purpose
Hemming's introduction to his work (Prefatio) claims that it was produced to teach Wulfstan's successors: about the things which have been committed to their care, and to show them which lands justly belong (or ought to belong) to the church, and which have been unjustly seized by evil men—first, during the Danish invasions; later, by unjust royal officials and tax collectors; and most recently, by the violence of Normans in our own time, who by force, guile and rapine have unjustly deprived this holy church of its lands, villages and possessions, until hardly anything is safe from their depredations.

The historian Richard Southern argues that, notwithstanding the stated aim of the work, it was not produced to be used in lawsuits, but rather as a kind of utopian picture of what was in the past. The goal was to depict those things that were beyond human recovery but that were "laid up in heaven". Because of its narrative structure, it should be seen not only as a documentation of the various landholdings of the diocese, but as a historical work as well. Unlike the Liber, it was not revised as the property changed hands, and this lack of revision has been seen as emphasizing the commemorative nature of the work. The historian John Reuben Davies sees a close parallel between Hemming's work and the Welsh medieval document The Book of Llandaf. Other similar works were the Norman pancartes, which were compilations of gifts to a monastery, connected by a narrative which was then presented to the dukes to secure confirmation of the gifts. These Norman works date from the early 11th century, and like Hemming's work, they are of great interest to the historian as sources for the study of medieval history. Also noting that Hemming's part of the compilation does not appear to have been revised or updated to meet new circumstances, Patrick Geary describes it as "a commemorative, historical volume, not a working administrative tool" and associates the work with counterparts produced in the continental West, such as Folcuin's chronicle cartulary Gesta abbatum S. Bertini Sithiensium.

More recently, Francesca Tinti has arrived at a different conclusion, arguing instead that Hemming's work, more so than the Liber Wigorniensis, came to serve very real needs, and that these specifically concerned the monastic community at Worcester. Although the Prefatio is silent about monks, the Enucleatio is explicit that Bishop Wulfstan had commissioned the work to defend the estates assigned for the sustenance of the monks (ad victum monachorum). She relates these concerns to the rapid growth of the community during Bishop Wulfstan's episcopate in the second half of the 11th century. The coming of the Norman newcomer, Samson, who had been involved in the dissolution of Westbury-on-Trym, would have given the enlarged community a particular incentive to safeguard its property and rights.

Contents
One of the themes of Hemming's work is the depredations suffered by his monastery at the hands of royal officials. One such notorious official from the last decade of King Æthelred's reign is Eadric Streona ("Grasper"), ealdorman of Mercia, blamed for having appropriated land held by the church in Gloucestershire and Wiltshire and for having incorporated the ancient county of Winchcombeshire into Gloucestershire. Hemming may have invented Eadric's byname of Streona, as it is not attested before appearing in Hemming's work.

Hemming singles out the conquests of England by Cnut and William the Conqueror as being especially damaging. He claims that the work only covers the lost estates that were assigned to support the cathedral chapter, but as he describes the loss of several manors that were listed in Domesday Book as belonging to the bishop, the work probably covers more than the author claims. It also contains a listing of amounts paid to King William to regain items the king had taken from the diocese. Worcester paid over 45.5 marks of gold to recover their belongings. Others singled out in the work as significant plunderers of Worcester's lands included Leofric, Earl of Mercia, and other members of his family.

The historian Ted Johnson Smith points out that the Codicellus has strong parallels to the Historia de Sancto Cuthberto. The Historia was written in Durham in the mid-10th century, and is a history of the monastery of St. Cuthbert from foundation until about 945. Like the Codicellus, it is a narrative concerned mainly to defend the patrimony of the monks against depredations.Gransden Historical Writing in England pp. 76–77

Also contained in Hemming's work is a description of the lawsuit between the diocese of Worcester and Evesham Abbey, which took place between 1078 and 1085. Although only Hemming relates the course of the proceedings, the Chronicon Abbatiae de Evesham, or Evesham Chronicle, also gives background information on the dispute. The litigation involved lands that the abbey held in Hampton and Bengeworth in Worcestershire, but that the diocese maintained were actually part of one of the bishopric's manors. Ownership became disputed under the abbacy of Æthelwig, when the abbot managed to acquire the allegiance of a number of the new owners of lands previously held from the diocese. After Æthelwig's death, most of these lands passed to Odo of Bayeux, but Evesham managed to retain Hampton and Bengeworth, which became the basis of the dispute. The lawsuit was complicated because part of the land had been granted by an earlier bishop, Beorhtheah, to a kinsman, Azur. After the Conquest, Azur's lands were given to Urse d'Abetot, the Sheriff of Worcester. Following Æthelwig's death, Wulfstan was able to secure a settlement with Æthelwig's successor Walter. The settlement, which was concluded in 1086, granted the lands to the abbey, but the diocese was the overlord of the lands, for which the abbey owed military service.

Contents of the manuscript
A brief overview of the contents of the manuscript follows, with the main sectioning and a general idea of the contents of each section.

Manuscript and publication history
The only other 11th-century cartulary surviving from England is the Oswald cartulary, also compiled at Worcester. Historian M. T. Clanchy has suggested that the form English cartularies took may have originated at Worcester, although fellow historian Robin Fleming has argued that Christ Church Canterbury's surviving cartulary is also an 11th-century compilation. Who owned the manuscript after it left Worcester Cathedral Priory, presumably with the Dissolution of the Monasteries in the 1540s, is unknown, but the manuscript was in the possession of Robert Cotton by 1612, when it is recorded as being loaned by Cotton to Arthur Agarde. There are annotations in the manuscript by John Joscelyn, who was secretary to Matthew Parker (d. 1575), the Elizabethan Archbishop of Canterbury, but whether Parker owned the manuscript is uncertain. The manuscript thus became part of the Cotton library, which passed into public ownership in 1702 on the death of Cotton's grandson on the basis of an act of Parliament of 1701.Staff "History of the Cotton Library" Help for Researchers The manuscript itself is now part of the British Library's holdings.

The manuscript was originally published in 1723 as Hemingi chartularium ecclesiæ Wigorniensis, in two volumes edited by Thomas Hearne. This was part of the Chronica Anglia series put out between 1709 and 1735, which included many chronicles and records in 20 volumes. Hearne printed his edition from a transcription made for the antiquary Richard Graves. This transcript, known as MS Rawlinson B.445, is not a completely accurate transcription of the Cotton Tiberius manuscript, as some items were omitted, and marginalia were not always transcribed. There were also some additions of decorations.

The entire manuscript of Cotton Tiberius A xiii is catalogued as number 366 in Helmut Gneuss's work Handlist of Anglo-Saxon Manuscripts''.

Notes

Citations

References

 
 
 
 
 
 
 
 
 
 
 
 
 
 
  also reprinted in

Further reading

External links

 Liber Wigorniensis and Hemming's Cartulary, London, BL, Cotton Tiberius A XIII, fos. 1–118, 119–200.
 Cotton Nero E i British Library description page for MS Cotton Nero E i
 Add. MS 46204 British Library description page for Add. MS 46204

11th-century manuscripts
Texts of Anglo-Saxon England
Cotton Library
English chronicles
English manuscripts
Latin historical texts from Norman and Angevin England
Medieval charters and cartularies of England